The Shenley River (in French: rivière Shenley) is a tributary of the west bank of the Chaudière River at Saint-Martin which flows northward to empty on the shore south of the St. Lawrence River. It flows in the municipalities of Saint-Honoré-de-Shenley and Saint-Martin, in the Beauce-Sartigan Regional County Municipality, in the administrative region of Chaudière-Appalaches, in Quebec, in Canada.

Geography 
The main neighboring watersheds of the Shenley River are:
 north side: Roy brook, Dutil brook, Pozer River, Chaudière River
 east side: Chaudière River
 south side: rivière de la Grande Coudée, Petit Portage River;
 west side: Toinon River, Le Petit Shenley, Bras Saint-Victor.

The Shenley River originates from several tributaries that drain the area south of Vaseux Lake, northeast of the village of Saint-Honoré-de-Shenley.

From its source, the Shenley River flows over  divided into the following segments:
  southeasterly, to the 2nd Rang de Shenley North;
  southeasterly, crossing route 269 and 4th rue West, to its confluence.

The Shenley River empties on the west bank of the Chaudière River at Saint-Martin.

Toponymy 
The toponym "Shenley River" was formalized on December 5, 1968 at the Commission de toponymie du Québec.

See also 

 List of rivers of Quebec

Notes and references 

Rivers of Chaudière-Appalaches